John Alexander Ahl (August 16, 1813 – April 25, 1882) was a surgeon, real estate developer, paper mill and iron furnace operator, railroad executive and United States Congressman from Pennsylvania. He was born in Strasburg, Pennsylvania in 1813.

Life and career
Ahl studied medicine at the University of Maryland, and graduated in 1832.  He moved to Centerville, Pennsylvania, where he practiced medicine through 1856.  That year, he began in the real estate business, bought a paper mill in Newville, Pennsylvania, and served as a delegate to the 1856 Democratic National Convention in Cincinnati.

Congress 
He was elected to the United States House of Representatives in 1857, leaving upon the completion of his first term.

Later career 
After Congress, he manufactured paper and operated an iron furnace in Sharpsburg, Maryland.  He also served as the planner and the major builder of the Harrisburg and Potomac Railroad.

Death
He died in Newville in 1882, and is buried in Big Spring Presbyterian Cemetery.

References
Who Was Who in America: Historical Volume, 1607-1896. Chicago: Marquis Who's Who, 1963.
The Political Graveyard

1813 births
1882 deaths
People from Strasburg, Pennsylvania
Democratic Party members of the United States House of Representatives from Pennsylvania
University of Maryland, College Park alumni
19th-century American railroad executives
19th-century American politicians